The 1999–2000 NBA season was the Hawks' 51st season in the National Basketball Association, and 32nd season in Atlanta. The Hawks played their first season at the Philips Arena, which was built over the site of The Omni. The Hawks received the tenth pick in the 1999 NBA draft from the Golden State Warriors, and selected Jason Terry from the University of Arizona. In the off-season, the team acquired Isaiah Rider and Jim Jackson from the Portland Trail Blazers, acquired Bimbo Coles from the Golden State Warriors, and acquired Lorenzen Wright from the Los Angeles Clippers.

After a 9–9 start to the season, the Hawks struggled losing 11 of their next 13 games. Rider led the team in scoring averaging 19.3 points per game, but had a history of behavioral problems both on and off the court. After showing up late for a game in March, he was released to free agency after 60 games, while Anthony Johnson was traded to the Orlando Magic for a future draft pick at midseason. Rider would later on sign with the Los Angeles Lakers during the following off-season. The Hawks struggled posting a nine-game losing streak in April, and finished seventh in the Central Division with a disappointing 28–54 record, missing the playoffs for the first time in eight years.

Jackson averaged 16.7 points and 5.0 rebounds per game, while Alan Henderson averaged 13.2 points and 7.0 rebounds per game, and Dikembe Mutombo provided the team with 11.5 points, 14.1 rebounds and 3.3 blocks per game, and was selected for the 2000 NBA All-Star Game. In addition, Coles contributed 8.1 points and 3.6 assists per game, while off the bench, LaPhonso Ellis provided with 8.4 points and 5.0 rebounds per game, but only played 58 games due to a calf injury, and Terry contributed 8.1 points and 4.3 assists per game, and was named to the NBA All-Rookie Second Team. Mutombo also finished tied in third place in Defensive Player of the Year voting. Following the season, head coach Lenny Wilkens resigned and left to take a coaching job with the Toronto Raptors, while Coles signed as a free agent with the Cleveland Cavaliers, and Ellis signed with the Minnesota Timberwolves.

For the season, the Hawks changed their uniforms adding side panels to their jerseys and shorts, which would remain in use until 2007. Although, the trim colors on the road jerseys were changed from white to red in 2004.

Draft picks

Roster

Roster Notes
 Shooting guard Isaiah Rider was waived on March 17.

Regular season

Season standings

z - clinched division title
y - clinched division title
x - clinched playoff spot

Record vs. opponents

Player statistics

Season

Awards and records
 Jason Terry, NBA All-Rookie Team 2nd Team

Transactions

Trades
June 23, 1999
 Traded Mookie Blaylock and a 1999 first round draft pick to the Golden State Warriors for Bimbo Coles, Duane Ferrell and a 1999 first round draft pick.

June 30, 1999
 Traded Jumaine Jones to the Philadelphia 76ers for a 2000 first round draft pick.

August 2, 1999
 Traded Ed Gray and Steve Smith to the Portland Trail Blazers for Jim Jackson and Isaiah Rider.

August 8, 1999
 Traded a 2000 first round draft pick, and a 2002 first round draft pick to the Los Angeles Clippers for Lorenzen Wright.

February 24, 2000
 Traded Anthony Johnson to the Orlando Magic for a 2004 second round draft pick.

Free agents
August 16, 1999
 Waived Duane Ferrell.
 Waived Tyrone Corbin.

March 20, 2000
 Waived Isaiah Rider.

March 27, 2000
 Signed Drew Barry to a contract for the rest of the season.

Player Transactions Citation:

References

Atlanta Hawks seasons
Atlanta
Atlanta Haw
Atlanta Haw